Stacked with Daniel Negreanu, known as simply Stacked, is a poker video game by American studio 5000 ft, released in 2006, featuring the titular professional championship player, Daniel Negreanu. Other pros also make an appearance, including Evelyn Ng (Negreanu's then girlfriend), Juan Carlos Mortensen, and Erick Lindgren. The game's style of poker is Texas hold'em.

The PC's online mode was hosted by MTV. The initial release for Xbox contained a serious bug that caused player data to be reset when playing on Xbox Live; a patch was available to fix these problems.

Reception

The game received "mixed" reviews on all platforms according to the review aggregation website Metacritic. Despite the mediocre score, it was frequently noted as being one of the best poker video games released to date, with special recognition towards the game's AI.

References

External links
 

2006 video games
Gamebryo games
PlayStation 2 games
Xbox games
PlayStation Portable games
Windows games
Casino video games
Poker video games
Video games developed in the United States